Myawaddy District (Phlone:,) is a district of the Kayin State in Myanmar. It consists of a single township  composed of 50 villages.

Townships
The district contains the following townships:
Myawaddy Township

Districts of Myanmar
Kayin State